Roleystone Community College is a Independent Public high school, located in Roleystone,  south east of Perth, Western Australia.

Planning for the school began in 1978 when the local community commenced discussions to prepared a detailed plan for a high school to be established in the area. The Department of Education and Training attended meetings in 1980 and by 1982 a decision was reached that a high school catering for students from Years 6 to 10 would be established.

The school opened in 1983 in temporary accommodation as Roleystone District High School, and the students moved to permanent buildings in term 2. The school was built amongst jarrah woodland to an award-winning design. By 1985 the school had over 600 enrolments. Further classrooms were added in 1986. The school had a total enrolment of 283 in 2007, 225 in 2008, 224 in 2009, 239 in 2010 and 207 in 2011.

See also

 List of schools in the Perth metropolitan area

References

External links
 Roleystone Community College website

Public high schools in Perth, Western Australia
1983 establishments in Australia
Educational institutions established in 1983